ABN or abn may refer to:

Companies
 ABN AMRO Group, a Dutch bank group
 ABN AMRO, sometimes referred to as "ABN" in shorthand, is a Dutch state-owned bank
 Algemene Bank Nederland, a now-defunct Dutch bank

Radio, news and television organizations
 ABN Andhra Jyothi, a Telugu language news channel based in India
 Agri Broadcast Network, an Ohio-based agricultural radio news network
 ABN (TV station), the Australian Broadcasting Corporation's Sydney TV station
 ABNXcess, the sole cable television operator in Malaysia
 Asahi Broadcasting Nagano, a TV station in Nagano Prefecture, Japan
 Asia Business News a now-defunct business news channel
 Agencia Bolivariana de Noticias, the national news agency of Venezuela
 Avivamiento Broadcasting Network, a religious local TV station in Bogotá, Colombia
 AMCARA Broadcasting Network, an Philippine-based broadcast company in Quezon City, Philippines

Other organizations
 Alaska Board of Nursing, the regional board of nurses in the state of Alaska, United States
 American Board of Professional Neuropsychology
 Anti-Bolshevik Bloc of Nations, an anti-Soviet Cold War group
 Aramaic Broadcast Network, part of the Tri-State Christian Television for some years
 Australian Bibliographic Network, former name of the Australian National Bibliographic Database, a shared library catalogue and service
 Niger Basin Authority (from its French name Authorité du Bassin du Niger), an intergovernmental organisation in West Africa

Other uses
 ABN (hip hop duo), or Assholes by Nature, rappers Trae and Z-Ro; also their 2003 album Assholes by Nature
 Absecon station, Amtrak station code ABN
 Abua language, a Central Delta language of Nigeria
 Akabane Station (railway station code), in Kita, Tokyo, Japan
 Albina Airstrip, Albina, Suriname (by IATA airport code)
 Australian Business Number, a unique identifier issued to business entities by the Australian Taxation Office
 Algemeen Beschaafd Nederlands (Common Civilized Dutch), the near-obsolete name for now "Common Dutch"